The Age of the Understatement is the debut album by English supergroup The Last Shadow Puppets, released on 15 April 2008 by Domino Recording Company. It was written between band co-frontmen Alex Turner and Miles Kane in 2006. It was produced in Paris and London by fellow member James Ford, featuring orchestral arrangements composed by Owen Pallett, and performed by the London Metropolitan Orchestra. The album artwork features a 1962 black and white picture, by photographer Sam Haskins, depicting a young woman, named Gill, sitting on the floor. 

The Age of the Understatement is a stylistic deviation from the indie rock sound found in Turner and Kane's previous work with the Arctic Monkeys and The Little Flames, respectively. It mainly features genres that include Symphonic pop, pop rock, and baroque pop. It also draws influence from French pop and film scores of the 1960s. 

The album was released to generally positive reviews. It was nominated for the 2008 Mercury Prize, and became the band's first number-one debut in the UK. Following its release, the album was promoted by the singles "The Age of the Understatement", "Standing Next to Me" and "My Mistakes Were Made for You", as well as a European and North American tour and multiple television appearances.

Background and recording
Turner and Kane first collaborated musically on the song 505, of Arctic Monkeys second album Favourite Worst Nightmare and on "Fluorescent Adolescent" B-sides "The Bakery" and "Plastic Tramp." It was during those recording sessions in 2006, when they decided to start a project together. Although they already had written some songs each, most were done collaboratively.

The album was mainly recorded over two weeks, in Black Box Studios, France, in August 2007, with an additional track recorded at RAK Studios in London, England. The process was simple with just Turner, Kane, Ford and engineer Jimmy Robertson participating in the sessions. The brass section and orchestration conducted by Owen Pallett, and performed by the 22-piece London Metropolitan Orchestra, were done in December. During the recording of the album Turner and Kane hired a documentary film-making team, Luke Seomore and Joseph Bull, to capture the story of the project.

The duo claimed the album was influenced by the music of Scott Walker, Serge Gainsbourg's Histoire de Melody Nelson, The Electric Prunes' Mass in F Minor, and Ennio Morricone's The Good, the Bad and the Ugly soundtrack.

Album art
The album art consists of a photo of Gill, an art student from Johannesburg, photographed by Sam Haskins in 1962. The photograph was chosen by Alex Turner, after he saw it in a copy of Haskins' book found by Alexa Chung, his girlfriend at the time, in Dover Street Market. Chung, also owned a print of the same image, which she hung in her New York apartment.

Release and promotion
On 20 February 2008, Miles Kane and Alex Turner revealed they would be known as the Last Shadow Puppets and that their album would be titled The Age of the Understatement and would be released on 21 April 2008. The band played their first ever show in Brooklyn, New York, at Sound Fix Records on 4 March 2008, playing a second gig at the Lower East Side's Cake Shop the following night. Their first show in the United Kingdom  was a short two song set on 5 April at the Lock Tavern in Camden, London, where they played "Meeting Place" and "Standing Next to Me".

Singles and videos
The first single, "The Age of the Understatement", was released the week before on 14 April, with new song "Two Hearts in Two Weeks" and covers of Billy Fury's "Wondrous Place" and David Bowie's "In the Heat of the Morning" —a song previously mentioned by Turner as a favourite— as b-sides. An accompanying music video directed by Romain Gavras, was released three days before. The video was shot mainly in Moscow, Russia, and features the band walking down the city, tanks, a girl ice skating, an Orthodox church, and a military choir. Gavras would later describe the shoot as "crazy" saying: "On the other side of the camera, it was a training camp with tanks shooting all the time, totally unsafe."

Their second single, "Standing Next to Me", was released on 7 July 2008. On 15 July a music video directed by Richard Ayoade was released. The video, shot in London, featured the band performing the song in what resembles to be a television studio accompanied by a group of dancers wearing colored leggings.

Their third and last single, "My Mistakes Were Made for You", was released on 20 October 2008, and it included live covers of Nancy Sinatra and Lee Hazlewood's "Paris Summer", featuring Alison Mosshart, and Burt Bacharach's "My Little Red Book" as b-sides. The corresponding music video, released a month earlier, was shot at Pinewood Studios and also directed by Ayoade. The music video shows Turner on a crashed car with Alexa Chung, his then girlfriend. Kane appears later. The video was inspired by Federico Fellini's cult film Toby Dammit.

Tour
In June 2008, the band announced their debut world tour, which would start on 19 August of that year. The Puppets and a 16-piece orchestra, played their first tour shows at Portsmouth Guildhall and New Theatre Oxford, before attending Reading and Leeds Festivals 2008. Kane said the two festival stops would be "our [the band] first proper gigs". Their Leeds set was described by The Guardian as "a classy offering from the Puppets. But, maybe, that isn't what's needed at a festival on a Friday night". The first leg of the tour ended with a show at The Olympia in Paris on 26 August. The tour restarted in October at Cirkus in Stockholm, and continued in continental Europe, throughout the rest of the month. Their London and Sheffield shows were generally well received by both fans and critics. The band played their last show at the Mayan Theater of Los Angeles on 3 November 2008.

Other performances
The band performed on a number of television shows including Later with Jools Holland, Friday Night with Jonathan Ross, and Canal +'s Concert Privé. On May, they played a four-song setlist for NPR's World Cafe. A month later, the Puppets played a secret set at Glastonbury with Arctic Monkeys' Matt Helders playing drums on "The Age of the Understatement" and Jack White playing a guitar solo on "Wondrous Place." On July, they performed "Standing Next to Me" and a cover of Rihanna's "SOS" as part of  BBC Radio 1's Live Lounge. On September, they performed at the 2008 Mercury Prize Awards, and a month later played a show at Philharmonic Hall, Liverpool as part of the Electric Proms.

Critical reception

The Age of the Understatement received largely positive reviews from contemporary music critics. At Metacritic, which assigns a normalized rating out of 100 to reviews from mainstream critics, the album received an average score of 77, based on 25 reviews, which indicates "generally favorable reviews".

Marc Hogan of Pitchfork gave the album a favorable review, stating, "The biggest difference between The Last Shadow Puppets and Turner's main gig is in the lyrics. Though less immediately noticeable than the majestic production, the change in the scale of Turner's songwriting is ultimately more profound." Hogan continues, calling the album "Turner's most impressive album-length statement yet, one that strives, musically and lyrically, for the epic grandeur of an era before GarageBand or MySpace, and avoids lapsing into pretentiousness by dint of its own headlong enthusiasm." On the difference between Turner's projects, Mikael Wood of Spin, thought the album replaced "the Arctic Monkeys’ circa-now cynicism with old-school romance".

On another favorable review, Alex Denney of Drowned In Sound, said the album represented, "The most ambitious music either musician has assailed" and added "The Age Of The Understatement is as solid an idea in execution as it is in concept; a record unafraid to reach beyond its obvious limitations and produce a swashbuckling end result that might even broaden a few horizons for fans and players alike." Nevertheless, he thought the record was "exaggerating the pomp and rigour of its forebears whilst falling inevitably short of their technical eloquence." Rolling Stone echoed this sentiment, describing the record as a "shameless nostalgia trip" even though it was a "compelling" one.

For The Guardian, Sam Wolfson, found the record to be an intimate one, "despite the grandness of the music", and highlighted Turner and Kane's vocal performances. For the same publication, Alexis Petridis, was less complimentary, pointing out that some tracks ambled down a "drearily well-trodden path" while also praising Turner's lyrics, noting his usual "witty-but-prosaic" writing, turned into something more opaque, but without "sacrificing sharpness".

Commercial performance
The Age of the Understatement debuted at number one on the UK Albums Charts, where it sold 51,186 copies in the first week. In April 2016, the record was certified Platinum by the British Phonographic Industry. As of February 2022 the album has sold 337,243 copies in the UK.

In the United States, the album debuted at number 111, on the Billboard 200 chart, and number nine on Billboard Independent Albums. It has sold 51,000 copies in the US as of March 2016.

Track listing

Different versions of the album list the last two tracks in a different manner. Catalog number WIGCD208 lists track No. 11 and No. 12 as "The Meeting Place" and "Time Has Come Again" respectively while catalog number WIGCD208S lists them as "Meeting Place" and "The Time Has Come Again".

Personnel
The Last Shadow Puppets
Alex Turner
Miles Kane
James Ford

Production
James Ford – production, mixing
Jimmy Robertson – engineering
Steve McGlaughlin – orchestra recording
Richard Woodcraft – mixing

Orchestrations
Owen Pallett – arrangement and conducting
London Metropolitan Orchestra – performance

Artwork
Sam Haskins – front cover photography
Deidre O' Callahan – portrait photography
Matthew Cooper – design
Jason Evans – design assistance

Charts and certifications

Weekly charts

Year-end charts

Certifications

Release history

References

2008 debut albums
The Last Shadow Puppets albums
Albums produced by James Ford (musician)